In enzymology, a glycosylceramidase is an enzyme that catalyzes the chemical reaction

glycosyl-N-acylsphingosine + H2O  N-acylsphingosine + a sugar

Thus, the two substrates of this enzyme are glycosyl-N-acylsphingosine and H2O, whereas its two products are N-acylsphingosine and sugar.

This enzyme belongs to the family of hydrolases, specifically those glycosidases that hydrolyse O- and S-glycosyl compounds.  The systematic name of this enzyme class is glycosyl-N-acylsphingosine glycohydrolase. Other names in common use include phlorizin hydrolase, phloretin-glucosidase, glycosyl ceramide glycosylhydrolase, cerebrosidase, phloridzin beta-glucosidase, lactase-phlorizin hydrolase, and phloridzin glucosidase.

References

 
 
 

EC 3.2.1
Enzymes of unknown structure